The Permeke Library is the main public library in Antwerp, Belgium. The library is open 7 days per week and visited by about 2,200 visitors a day.

History 

The library is named after Oscar Permeke, a cousin of Constant Permeke, who used to run the garage Permeke Motors in the building previously. In 1982, the Permeke garage went bankrupt and closed its doors. 

The library opened on 22 April 2005, the last day on which Antwerp held the title of World Book Capital. The public library located at the Lange Nieuwstraat had closed on 1 September 2004.

The poem Binnen by Belgian writer and poet Bart Moeyaert is on display in the library.

References

External links 

 

Libraries in Belgium
2005 establishments in Belgium
Libraries established in 2005
Buildings and structures in Antwerp